Krzeszów may refer to the following villages in Poland:
Krzeszów, Lower Silesian Voivodeship (south-west Poland)
Krzeszów, Subcarpathian Voivodeship (south-east Poland)
Krzeszów, Lesser Poland Voivodeship (south Poland)